The 1912–13 Harvard Crimson men's ice hockey season was the 16th season of play for the program.

Season
Harvard entered the year with a team that may have been less talented than previous squads, but it was no less competitive. The team displayed an increasing level of play throughout December between practices and scrimmages with the Boston Athletic Association. The available ice at the Boston Arena paid dividends for the Crimson in allowing them to hone their game in their attempt to reclaim the championship.

The Crimson made up for last year's poor start with a dominant 4–0 win over MIT where the team used many of its backup players throughout the game. After returning from the winter break Harvard faced a tough Ottawa team and could not find its footing offensively, losing 0–2 despite a stellar effort from team captain Gardner. The team buckled down and prepared itself for a match against Toronto a week later. When the Blues arrived in town they found an impenetrable wall in front of the Harvard cage and left after a 0–2 loss to the Crimson.

After dismantling Cornell 8–2, Harvard welcomed defending champion Princeton in one of the most anticipated games of the season. The teams locked horns and battled nearly the same as they had the year before; Princeton's offense, led by Hobey Baker applied a continual assault on the Crimson defenders but neither team could beat the other in regulation. With the score 3–3 the two teams had agreed to play two 5-minute overtime periods in case they were needed. Harvard was able to score once in each extra frame and take the game 5–3, putting themselves at a great advantage in their pursuit of a championship.

By the time Harvard played Yale on February 1, the teams had arranged a best-of-three series so that Harvard, Yale and Princeton would play one another at least twice. If any of the three emerged as a clear victor they would likely be able to claim the collegiate championship as the teams were typically among the best in the nation. Harvard's solid win over the Bulldogs had them on the cusp of a terrific season but in the second game against Princeton the Tiger attack was too much to cope with and a third game was required to settle the series. While the third game would not officially decide the champion, as Harvard still had Yale left to play, Princeton could secure the championship if it won the rubber match. With this in mind Gardner produced one of the most brilliant goaltending performances in school history, turning away 29 shots en route to a 3–0 victory, the only time in the three years with Baker that Princeton would fail to score.

With Yale still remaining, Harvard couldn't slow down if they wanted to claim the championship. The Elis played Harvard tough in the first half, scoring the only goal of the frame to put a bit of fear in the minds of the Crimson faithful. The game remained the same through most of the second half but with 5 minutes left the Crimson offense awoke and scored three times. Yale added one just before the end of the game but it wasn't enough to turn the tide and Harvard skated away with the collegiate hockey championship.

Roster

Standings

Schedule and Results

|-
!colspan=12 style=";" | Regular Season

Scoring Statistics

Note: Assists were not recorded as a statistic.† Statistics from the game against Dartmouth are not available.

References

Harvard Crimson men's ice hockey seasons
Harvard
Harvard
Harvard
Harvard
Harvard